Kee Mu is a 2008 Indian Tamil-language romantic drama tragedy film directed by Majith. The film stars newcomer Hassan and newcomer Sarika, with Vadivelu, Charan Raj, Soori, Karthik Sabesh, Marks and Majith playing supporting roles. The film, produced by M. S. Yakobubeen, was released on 5 September 2008 to below average reviews.

Plot

The film begins with a disfigured Ramya (Sarika) living near a salt pan in Thoothukudi. Her father Bhavani (Charan Raj) and his henchmen then forcibly take her to the hospital in Chennai. From her hospital bed, she remembers her past.

Saravanan (Hassan) was a poor boy delivering mutton pieces throughout the city. Ramya, on the other hand, was a rich spoilt brat who is the daughter of the city bigwig Bhavani, a strict yet affectionate father. Saravanan and his three friends - Nethili Murugan (Soori), Sodhappal Sodalamuthu (Karthik Sabesh), and Ganesan (Marks) - were all from Thoothukudi and were working to make ends meet in Chennai. Ramya, who was irritated by Saravanan for no particular reason, makes fun of him and teases him on multiple occasions. She even made Saravanan believe that she was in love with him, and then the heartbroken Saravanan realized that it was all acting. Ramya felt guilty for breaking his heart, so she tried to apologize to Saravanan, but he kept avoiding her. One day, Ramya kissed Saravanan in public and confessed her love for him, and then he fell in love with her as well.

When Bhavani got to know of his daughter's love, he decided to arrange his daughter's marriage as soon as possible. Ramya took a bundle of notes and her jewellery and fled from her home. She was still an underage girl, but in seven days, she will reach the legal age of majority and be able to marry Saravanan at the registrar office. The couple, accompanied by the three friends, started travelling by bus from Courtallam to Thiruchendur. Bhavani and his henchmen eventually captured the couple in Kerala with the help of police.

Ramya then convinced her father to marry Saravanan. Bhavani changed his mind for the happiness of his daughter, and he finally accepted for the marriage. In a twist of fate, Bhavani's henchman Kasi (Majith) killed Saravanan to save his boss' honour. Ramya then jumped into her lover's funeral pyre. She was saved by the people, but the fire disfigured her face.

The film ends with Ramya returning to Thoothukudi to live with Saravanan's father, while the henchman Kasi has now become a lunatic.

Cast

Hassan as Saravanan
Sarika as Ramya
Vadivelu as Madasami
Charan Raj as Bhavani
Soori as Nethili Murugan
Karthik Sabesh as Sodhappal Sodalamuthu
Marks as Ganesan
Majith as Kasi
Thambi Ramaiah
Halwa Vasu as Coconut Seller
Bava Lakshmanan as Thief
Subburaj as Thief
Bonda Mani as Waiter
Vijay Ganesh as Police Officer
Chelladurai as Rice Shop Owner
Vengal Rao as Fake Doctor
Sangeetha Balan as Nethili Murugan's aunt
Amirthalingam
Rangamma Paatti
Risha
Anisha Narang

Production
Director Majith, who made his directorial debut with Thamizhan starring Vijay, returned after a brief hiatus to direct this youthful love story, based on a real life incident. His second film, Thunichal was postponed indefinitely due to financial restraints and remained unreleased; therefore, Majith promptly started off with Kee Mu. The film was shot in MGR Nagar market, Madurai, Tirunelveli, Kanyakumari, and other places where the real incidents took place. The film introduced Hassan and Sarika as the lead pair, Charan Raj signed to play the villain, while Vadivelu was chosen to play the comedian.

Soundtrack

The soundtrack was composed by Elango Kalaivanan. The soundtrack, released in 2008, features 6 tracks.

Reception
Pavithra Srinivasan of Rediff.com gave 1.5 stars out of 5 for the film and said that the film is "nothing more than a mock-glorified attempt at recreating Kaadhal". Another reviewer said, "That originality is what's missing in Kee. Mu., which comes off looking like a clone of Kaadhal. With its realism and good characterization, the film does have its positives but the similarities to Kaadhal are just too many to ignore".

References

External links

2008 films
2000s Tamil-language films
2008 romantic drama films
Indian romantic drama films
Romance films based on actual events
Films shot in Chennai
Films shot in Madurai
Films shot in Tirunelveli
Films shot in Thoothukudi
Films shot in Kerala